Servcorp Limited is a multinational organisation that sells Serviced Offices, Virtual Offices, Coworking Spaces, Meeting Rooms, Community Packages, and IT Services to entrepreneurs, startups, SME's and large enterprises. It was established in 1978 and listed on the Australian Stock Exchange in 1999. As of 9 December 2020, it operates in 125+ business centres in 43 cities across 21 countries. The company currently has 85 coworking locations globally.

Servcorp has registered and owns a trademark for the phrase "Everything but the office".

History
Servcorp was founded by Alfred Moufarrige in 1978. In 1980 Servcorp pioneered the virtual office concept. In 1990, Servcorp expanded to Singapore, then throughout South East Asia, France and Japan. Servcorp was listed on the Australian Stock Exchange in 1999.

In 1999, Servcorp launched its first Chinese offices in Shanghai.

In 2003, Servcorp was the leading Australian employer in Japan with 130 Tokyo staff.

Servcorp opened its first United Kingdom office in 2009. It opened its first United States location in 2010.

Servcorp opened its first office in İstanbul Turkey in 2010 and second one in 2011 in Tekfen Tower. 

In April 2014, Servcorp opened new offices in Beijing's Fortune Financial Center. In August 2014, Servcorp signed a 15-year lease for the 85th floor of the One World Trade Center.

In February 2016, Servcorp turned to the business version of Dropbox to provide a file-sharing solution to its employees.

In July 2018, Servcorp launched a new internal platform for clients called Servcorp Home which integrates the company's community and IT services.

In October 2018, Servcorp celebrated its 40th anniversary.

in February 2019, Servcorp opened its first location in Berlin, Germany.

References

Multinational companies headquartered in Australia
1978 establishments in Australia
Property management companies
Companies listed on the Australian Securities Exchange
Real estate companies of Australia
Companies based in Sydney